Alba Silvius (said to have reigned 1028–989 BC) was in Roman mythology the fifth king of Alba Longa.  He was the son of Latinus Silvius and the father of Atys.  He reigned thirty-nine years.

Later tradition 
In Geoffrey of Monmouth's pseudo-historical Historia Regum Britanniae, British king Ebraucus sent his thirty daughters to Alba Silvius, where they were married among the Trojan nobility, as the Latin and Sabine women refused to associate with them. Alba Silvius assisted Ebraucus' twenty sons (except for Brutus Greenshield) in conquering Germany. Geoffrey gives the name of his son and successor as "Sylvius Epitus", instead of Atys.

Family tree

References

Kings of Alba Longa